Eagle Tavern is an historic inn and tavern located at Upper Makefield Township, Bucks County, Pennsylvania, which was built circa 1800.

It was listed on the National Register of Historic Places in 1978.

History and architectural features
The original section was erected sometime around 1800. It is a two-and-one-half story, two-bay stone structure with a steeply pitched gable roof. 

A larger section that is a two-and-one-half story, three-bay by three-bay, stone structure was added in 1854. It features eyebrow windows on the front and rear facades. 

During the 19th century, the building was used as a hotel, store, post office, and polling place. It was later converted to a single family residence.

It was listed on the National Register of Historic Places in 1978.

Gallery

References 

Hotel buildings on the National Register of Historic Places in Pennsylvania
Commercial buildings completed in 1854
Buildings and structures in Bucks County, Pennsylvania
Drinking establishments on the National Register of Historic Places in Pennsylvania
1854 establishments in Pennsylvania
National Register of Historic Places in Bucks County, Pennsylvania